Francisco Rivera Agüero (1951–2001), known better as Curro Rivera, was a Mexican bullfighter.  In the 1970s, he was known as a member of the "Golden Trio" alongside Eloy Cavazos and Manolo Martinez. He died of a heart attack at the age of 49 while training on his ranch.

References

Mexican bullfighters
1951 births
2001 deaths
Sportspeople from Mexico City